Eric Warren Singer is an American screenwriter.

Career 
Singer and fellow screenwriter, David O. Russell, were nominated for an Academy Award for Best Original Screenplay for the 2013 film American Hustle, but lost to Spike Jonze for Her.

Future projects

Sony Pictures Entertainment bought Marita, a pitch from Singer, which would star Jennifer Lawrence.

Filmography

 The International (2009)
 American Hustle (2013)
 Only the Brave (2017)
 Top Gun: Maverick'' (2022)

References

External links

20th-century births
Living people
American male screenwriters
Jewish American writers
Best Screenplay AACTA International Award winners
Best Original Screenplay BAFTA Award winners
Year of birth missing (living people)
21st-century American Jews